Dowlatabad (also Romanized as Dowlatābād and Daulatābād) is a village in Tajan Rural District, in the Central District of Sarakhs County, Razavi Khorasan Province, Iran. At the 2006 census, its population was 520, in 109 families.

References 

Populated places in Sarakhs County